Crystal Springs is a hamlet in east central Saskatchewan, Canada, located between Waitville and Tway. It was originally known as Bon Eau, which is French for good water. When English settlers arrived they changed the name to Crystal Springs. This hamlet is 30 miles southeast of Prince Albert.

Demographics 

References 

Designated places in Saskatchewan
Invergordon No. 430, Saskatchewan
Organized hamlets in Saskatchewan
Division No. 15, Saskatchewan